Sobha Singh (29 November 1901 – 22 August 1986) was an artist from Punjab, India.

Early life

Sardar Sobha Singh was born on 29 November 1901 in a Sikh family in Sri Hargobindpur, Gurdaspur district of Punjab. His father, Deva Singh, was in the Indian cavalry. Sobha Singh joined British Indian Army as a draughtsman in 1919 and served at Iraq till 1923 when he resigned from the Army and opened his own studio at Amritsar in 1923. He moved to Lahore, Preet Nagar, Delhi, and Bombay before finally settling down in Andretta in 1947 as he was forced to leave Lahore due to the partition of India. Andretta Andretta (near Palampur), a remote and then little-known hamlet in the Kangra Valley on the foothills of the Himalayas but Sobha Singh brought this tiny village on International art map by his various classic works. Sobha Singh is fondly remembered as Darji and his daughter Bibi Gurcharan Kaur, assisted by her son Dr. Hirday Paul Singh,  has converted Andretta into an ever-popular tourist destination not only for art enthusiasts but for all who admire his work.

Education and training
At age 15, Sobha Singh entered the Industrial School at Amritsar for a one-year course in art and craft. He joined the British Indian army as a draftsman and served in Baghdad, Mesopotamia (now Iraq). In 1923 he left army and returned to Amritsar, where he opened his art studio. In the same year, he married Bibi Inder Kaur on Baisakhi day. He worked from his studios at Amritsar, Lahore (1926) and Delhi (1931).

In 1946, he went back to Lahore and opened his studio at Anarkali and was working as an art director for a film when he was forced to leave the city due to partition of the country. In 1949 he settled down in Andretta (near Palampur), a remote and then little-known place in the Kangra Valley, beginning his career as a painter. Now, this place is very well known due to Sobha Singh Art Gallery and Museum. The family of the late artist has also added 'Artist Residency' in the ever-popular 'Grow More Good' complex.

Painting

During his 39-year stay at Andretta, S. Sobha Singh painted hundreds of paintings. His main focus was Sikh gurus, their life and work. His series on the Sikh gurus have dominated to an extent that his paintings dominate the public's perception associated with Guru Nanak Dev Ji and Guru Gobind Singh ji.
The portrait he made in honor of the 500th birth anniversary of Guru Nanak in 1969 is the one most people believe to be the visage of Guru Nanak. Sobha Singh painted pictures of other gurus as well, Guru Amar Das, Guru Tegh Bahadur and Guru Har Krishan.
His paintings of Sohni Mahiwal and Heer Ranjha were also very popular. He also painted impressive portraits of national heroes and leaders like Shaheed Bhagat Singh, Kartar Singh Sarabha, Mahatma Gandhi, Lal Bahadur Shastri, etc.
His murals are displayed in the art gallery of Indian Parliament House in New Delhi. The panel depicting the evolution of Sikh history features Guru Nanak with Bala and Mardana on one side; and Guru Gobind Singh in meditation on the other. Sobha Singh also dabbled in sculpture and did the busts of some eminent Punjabis such as M.S. Randhawa, Prithviraj Kapoor, and Nirmal Chandra, and an incomplete head-study of the Punjabi poet Amrita Pritam. The originals of his works are displayed in Sobha Singh Art Gallery at Andretta. The general public can also visit his studio in Andretta.
Sobha Singh died in Chandigarh on 22 August 1986. Andretta (Palampur) is so popular because of the Sobha Singh Art Gallery and many of the visitors from all over the world including tourists visit Andretta to see his art.

Awards
Numerous awards and distinctions were conferred on him, the prominent being the title of State Artist of the Punjab Government in 1974 and the Padma Shri of the Government of India in 1983. He was conferred upon the degree of Doctor of Literature (Honoris Causa) by Punjabi University, Patiala.

The Ministry of Information and Broadcasting released a documentary film titled Painter of the People based on his life and works. The British Broadcasting Corporation also made a documentary on him in 1984. Indian Government issued postal stamp in honour of Sobha Singh in 2001.

References

External links

 
 Get to know Sobha Singh and his life
 Sobha Singh page on 123himachal.com
 

Indian Sikhs
1901 births
1986 deaths
People from Gurdaspur
Punjabi people
Recipients of the Padma Shri in arts
Indian portrait painters
20th-century Indian painters
Indian male painters
Painters from Punjab, India
20th-century Indian male artists